Lower Wunna (Nand) Dam (also called Wadgaon Dam) is an earthfill and gravity dam on Nand river near Nagpur in state of Maharashtra in India.

Specifications

Purpose
 Irrigation

See also
 Dams in Maharashtra
 List of reservoirs and dams in India

References

Dams in Nagpur district
Dams completed in 1997
1997 establishments in Maharashtra